Colegio Alemán de Guatemala is a German international school in Zone 11, Guatemala City. It serves levels kindergarten through bachillerato (senior high school).

It is categorized as a German school abroad by the Zentralstelle für das Auslandsschulwesen. It is one of more than 140 German schools abroad and has the status of an encounter school with a bicultural school goal, i.e. it leads to the German Abitur as well as the national Bachillerato.

History
The school was founded on 1 January 1901 by the Asociación de Educación y Cultura "Alejandro von Humboldt".

At the celebration of its 100th anniversary in 2001, the German School Guatemala was awarded the "Orden del Quetzal en grado de Gran Cruz" by the Guatemalan government for its outstanding educational work.

References

External links

  Colegio Alemán de Guatemala
  Colegio Alemán de Guatemala

German international schools in North America
Schools in Guatemala City
International schools in Guatemala
Educational institutions established in 1901
1901 establishments in Guatemala